Eurovision Song Contest's Greatest Hits (also known as Eurovision's Greatest Hits) was a live television concert programme organised by the European Broadcasting Union (EBU) and produced by the British Broadcasting Corporation (BBC) to commemorate the 60th anniversary of the Eurovision Song Contest. The concert took place on 31 March 2015 at the Eventim Apollo, in Hammersmith, London. Simon Proctor was the senior producer and David Arch was the musical director for the concert. Tickets for the event went on sale at 10:15 (GMT) on 6 February 2015.

Graham Norton and Petra Mede hosted the event, which saw fifteen acts from thirteen countries performing their Eurovision entries from yesteryear. During the televised show, video montages from the Eurovision archives were shown in-between each live performance. The UK entry for the Eurovision Song Contest 2015, "Still in Love with You" by Electro Velvet, was performed at the concert as the opening act, but never broadcast on the televised show. Riverdance performed a reprise of their  interval act as part of the anniversary celebrations.

Several countries confirmed that they would air the delayed broadcast of the concert on various dates that suited the broadcasters' schedules, including , who first competed in the Eurovision Song Contest 2015 as a wildcard entry. The host broadcaster BBC and the Irish broadcaster Raidió Teilifís Éireann (RTÉ) simulcast the show on Good Friday, 3 April 2015, across BBC One and RTÉ 2. In turn, several countries chose not to broadcast the event, including , who had an act taking part.

Location

Confirmation came on 3 February 2015 that the concert event would take place at the Eventim Apollo, in Hammersmith, London. This was the first time that London hosted a Eurovision event since the Eurovision Dance Contest 2007.

Organisation
It was announced on 22 October 2014, that the EBU had appointed the British broadcaster BBC to co-produce a special anniversary show to celebrate sixty years of the Eurovision Song Contest, similar to the show Congratulations: 50 Years of the Eurovision Song Contest which took place in 2005. The details regarding the title of the show were unknown at the time the announcement was made.

The EBU later issued the following statement regarding the 60th anniversary: "There are various exciting proposals from member broadcasters on the table to celebrate the 60th anniversary beyond the contest in May, which are currently in the final stages of being evaluated. A decision is expected shortly, so stay tuned!". Edgar Böhm, executive producer of the 2015 Eurovision Song Contest said in an interview that the BBC had been chosen to host a special anniversary show. Guy Freeman was appointed as executive producer for the event, assisted by Senior Producer Simon Proctor, the script was co-written by Edward af Sillén, Daniel Réhn, Christine Rose and Simon Proctor whilst the director was Geoff Posner, who had previously directed the Eurovision Song Contest 1998 in Birmingham.

Presenters

On 3 February 2015, it was announced that Graham Norton and Petra Mede would co-host the concert show. Mede was the host of Melodifestivalen 2009 (Swedish national selection show), host of the Eurovision Song Contest 2013 and later co-host of the Eurovision Song Contest 2016.

Tickets
Tickets for the anniversary concert went on sale from 10:15 (GMT) on 6 February 2015 via the BBC's Eurovision website and the Eurovision Song Contest's official website.

Programme
The concert was recorded live on 31 March 2015 at the Eventim Apollo, London; allowing participating broadcasters the freedom to air the programme on a date and channel that was convenient for their broadcasting schedules. Fifteen artists, representing thirteen countries, took part in the sixtieth anniversary gala event. The first-ever winner of the contest (in 1956), Lys Assia, appeared in the audience as a guest of honour. During the broadcast, video montages were shown prior to each entry, showing footage for that particular year's contest, ending with Eurovision Song Contest footage for the entry that was about to perform on stage. Recap montages of Eurovision entries over the last sixty years, were also broadcast in-between performances. These sometimes differed between the UK/BBC and non-UK broadcasts because of copyright clearance and were as follows:

 Teach-In – "Ding-a-dong": , 
 Olivia Newton-John – "Long Live Love": , 
 Céline Dion – "Ne partez pas sans moi": , 
 Jedward – "Lipstick": , 
 ABBA – "Waterloo": , 
 Serebro – "Song#1": , 
 Izhar Cohen & the Alphabeta – "A-Ba-Ni-Bi": , 
 Kathy Kirby – "I Belong": , 
 Bucks Fizz – "Making Your Mind Up": , 
 Sonia – "Better the Devil You Know": , 
 Imaani – "Where Are You?": , 
 Lynsey de Paul & Mike Moran – "Rock Bottom": , 
 Michael Ball – "One Step Out of Time": , 
 Cliff Richard – "Congratulations": , 
 Sandie Shaw – "Puppet on a String": , 
 Dana – "All Kinds of Everything": , 
 Sheeba – "Horoscopes": , 
 Amina Annabi – "Le Dernier qui a parlé...": , 
 Roberto Bellarosa – "Love Kills": , 
 Wig Wam – "In My Dreams": , 
 Ira Losco – "7th Wonder": , 
 Lena – "Satellite": , 
 Niamh Kavanagh – "In Your Eyes": , 
 Birthe Kjaer – "Vi maler byen rød": ,

Opening and interval acts
Electro Velvet performed their entry representing the UK at the Eurovision Song Contest 2015, "Still in Love with You". This performance did not appear on the televised show, but was exclusively done for the audience members of the concert hall itself and was later uploaded on the BBC's social media pages and YouTube channel. The interval act for the show was Riverdance. Consisting of traditional Irish music and dance, and featuring Irish dancing champions Jean Butler and Michael Flatley, with a score composed by Limerick native Bill Whelan, it originated as an interval performance during the Eurovision Song Contest 1994.

Performances
Fifteen Eurovision acts from thirteen countries participated in the anniversary concert. Although there were originally fourteen acts confirmed by the BBC, it was later announced on 5 March 2015 that 's Bobbysocks would join the line-up increasing the total to fifteen. Video montages were shown prior to each entry, showing footage for that particular year's contest, ending with Eurovision Song Contest footage for the entry that was about to perform on stage.

Reprise performance
A medley of some of the Eurovision Song Contest's greatest hits were performed in English by all of the participating artists, as a reprise act at the close of the show.

Broadcasts
As the show was not broadcast live, the participating national broadcasters were able to broadcast the show on a date and channel that was convenient for their broadcasting schedules.  Some broadcasters – such as Austria and Sweden – recorded additional links and interviews in London for their viewers and these were used as previews for the main show.

The show was watched by 1.89 million viewers in the United Kingdom with a market share of 9.5%.

Commentators
The following countries, listed in order of broadcasting dates, had confirmed that they would broadcast the anniversary show.

Non-broadcasting countries
The following countries declined to broadcast the show:

  (ARMTV)
  (ČT)
  (RTL)
  (MKRTV)
  (AVROTROS)
  (NTU)

The following countries, which had participated in the Eurovision Song Contest at least once, had not announced their plans on whether to broadcast the show.

See also
Songs of Europe (1981)
Congratulations: 50 Years of the Eurovision Song Contest (2005)
Eurovision: Europe Shine a Light (2020)

Notes

References

External links
 60 Years of Eurovision
 

2015 in London
2015 in British music
Greatest Hits
Nostalgia television shows
Eurovision Song Contest 2015
March 2015 events in the United Kingdom
Events in London